Gyllenhammar is a surname. Notable people with the surname include:

 Cecilia Gyllenhammar (born 1961), Swedish author
 Charlotte Gyllenhammar (born 1963), Swedish  artist 
 Pehr Gyllenhammar (1901–1988), Swedish insurance company executive
 Pehr G. Gyllenhammar (born 1935), Swedish businessman
 Ralf Gyllenhammar (born 1966) Swedish musician